Clinton Hill (born 19 April 1980) is an Australian athlete. Born in Johannesburg, South Africa, his family moved to Australia in 1997. He became an Australian citizen in June 2000 and was selected for the national 400 metres team.

He competed in the 400 Metres at the 2004 Olympics, but was knocked out in the heats. However, Hill anchored the Australian team that won the silver medal in the 4 × 400 metres relay.

In 2006 the Australian relay team won the gold medal at the Commonwealth Games.

Competition record

External links
 
 Athletics Australia profile

External links 
 
 

1980 births
Living people
Australian male sprinters
Olympic athletes of Australia
Athletes (track and field) at the 2004 Summer Olympics
Athletes (track and field) at the 2008 Summer Olympics
Athletes (track and field) at the 2006 Commonwealth Games
Olympic silver medalists for Australia
Commonwealth Games gold medallists for Australia
Commonwealth Games medallists in athletics
South African emigrants to Australia
Australian Institute of Sport track and field athletes
Sportspeople from Johannesburg
Medalists at the 2004 Summer Olympics
Olympic silver medalists in athletics (track and field)
Universiade medalists in athletics (track and field)
Universiade silver medalists for Australia
Medalists at the 2001 Summer Universiade
Competitors at the 2001 Goodwill Games
21st-century Australian people
Medallists at the 2006 Commonwealth Games